Ethinylestradiol/norethisterone (EE/NET), or ethinylestradiol/norethindrone, is a combination birth control pill which contains ethinylestradiol (EE), an estrogen and norethisterone (NET), a progestin. It is used for birth control, symptoms of menstruation, endometriosis, and menopausal symptoms. Other uses include acne. It is taken by mouth. Some preparations of EE/NET additionally contain an iron supplement in the form of ferrous fumarate.

Side effects can include nausea, headache, blood clots, breast pain, depression, and liver problems. Use is not recommended during pregnancy, the initial three weeks after childbirth, and in those at high risk of blood clots. It, however, may be started immediately after a miscarriage or abortion. Smoking while using combined birth control pills is not recommended. It works by stopping ovulation, making the uterus not suitable for implantation, and making the mucus at the opening to the cervix thick.

This combination pill was approved for medical use in the United States in 1964. It is on the World Health Organization's List of Essential Medicines. It is available as a generic medication. It is marketed under a large number of brand names. In 2020, it was the 45th most commonly prescribed medication in the United States, with more than 14million prescriptions.

See also
 Mestranol/norethisterone
 Oral contraceptive formulations
 List of combined sex-hormonal preparations

References

Combined oral contraceptives
World Health Organization essential medicines
Wikipedia medicine articles ready to translate